Soft Top Hard Shoulder is a 1992 British comedy drama film directed by Stefan Schwartz, produced by Richard Holmes, written by and starring Peter Capaldi and also starring Elaine Collins (Capaldi's future wife), Frances Barber, Jeremy Northam, Phyllis Logan and Richard Wilson.

Plot
Gavin Bellini is a Glaswegian artist who left home to live in London seeking his fortune as a children's illustrator.  Seven years later, he has not found the success he desired, but lives on the brink of starvation with a friend who is too kind to insist on the rent being paid. As his fortunes have declined, Gavin has been avoiding phone calls from his family back home in Glasgow. Gavin's family were ice-cream makers who had a factory in Glasgow and have recently sold it as Gavin's father is in poor health. By chance, his Uncle Salvatore - the head of the Bellini family - is down in London for the Ice Cream awards, and happens across Gavin in an Italian restaurant.  He sits Gavin down to talk to him about his absence and gives him the ultimatum that he needs to be in Glasgow in 2 days time at 7:30pm sharp for his father's 60th birthday party.  Gavin is reluctant, but Salvatore lets him know that the recent sale of the ice-cream factory has netted a profit which is to be shared amongst the children of the family - and if Gavin fails to show up, he will not receive his share of the profits.  Salvatore gives him £30 to cover the petrol.

Emboldened by the prospect of some much-needed cash, Gavin decides to drive up to Glasgow in his 1971 Triumph Herald, a car given to him by a Country & Western group for doing the graphics for their album. With just the £30 given to him by his uncle, Gavin begins a road trip from London to Glasgow, picking up a mysterious female hitchhiker named Yvonne along the way. They face numerous setbacks — Gavin loses his wallet, the car breaks down, they board the wrong bus, and others — before ultimately reaching their destination. Only there, after being mistaken by the police for a van thief, does Gavin discover that Yvonne has been fleeing her wedding to a man she did not love and realize that he loves her himself, and loves her less-cynical view of life. He brings her to his father's party where he refuses the cash offered by his uncle.

Cast
 Peter Capaldi ...  Gavin Bellini
 Frances Barber ...  Miss Trumble
 Catherine Russell ...  Animal Rights Activist
 Jeremy Northam ...  John
 Richard Wilson ...  Uncle Salvatore
 Elaine Collins ...  Yvonne
 Peter Ferdinando ...  Homeless Youth
 Sophie Hall ...  Nancy
 Scott Hall ...  Mr. Young
 Simon Callow ...  Eddie Cherdowski
 Phyllis Logan ...  Karla
 Robert James ...  Campbell
 Andrew Downie ...  Brodie
 Ann Scott-Jones ...  Mrs. Tutty
 Lindy Whiteford ...  Peggy
 Bill Gavin ...  Man in Tiny Car
 Michael Nardone ...  Stevie
 Billy McColl ...  Kevin the Guru
 Clive Russell ...  Clegg
 Jeremy Lee ...  Radio Voices
 Kate Harding ...  Radio Voices

Music
The score and title track, "Soft Top, Hard Shoulder", were composed by Chris Rea.

Reception
The film was a surprise hit, and won two Scottish BAFTAS. Critics noted its similarities to Bill Forsyth films.

A re-mastered version was released in December 2013 on Vimeo On Demand.

Awards

References

External links

Capaldiwatching: Soft Top, Hard Shoulder and Strictly Sinatra
http://vimeo.com/ondemand/softtop

1993 films
1990s road comedy-drama films
Films directed by Stefan Schwartz
British road comedy-drama films
1992 comedy films
1992 films
1993 comedy films
1992 drama films
1993 drama films
1990s English-language films
1990s British films